Khevkharacha-Yalkhara,, or just Yalkhara, is a village in Galanchozhsky District, Chechnya.

Location 

Yalkhara is located in the center of Galanchozhsky District.

The closest settlements to Yalkhara are Tsecha-Äkhk in the west, Aka-Bass in the south, and Khaybakha in the south-east.

History 
Yalkhara is the ancestral home of the Yalkhoroy teip.

From 1940 to 1944, Yalkhara was the administrative center of Galanchozhsky District.

On 27 February 1944, after the genocide and deportation of the Chechen and Ingush people and the Chechen-Ingush ASSR was abolished, the village of Yalkhara was abandoned and destroyed.

In 1957, after the Vaynakh people returned and the Chechen-Ingush ASSR was restored, the former residents of Galanchozhsky District were forbidden to resettle there. As a result, most former residents of Yalkhara resettled in the flat lands of the republic, mostly in the Achkhoy-Martanovsky, Groznensky and Sernovodsky districts.

In 2019, Yalkhara was named as one of the first 7 settlements in Galanchozhsky District to be rebuilt in order to resettle the area.

Notable people 
Dzhokhar Dudayev, the first President of the Chechen Republic of Ichkeria, was born in Yalkhara, just days before it was abandoned. He was a member of the Tsecho teip, sometimes confused with Yalkhoroy due to his birthplace.

References

Geography of Chechnya
History of Chechnya

Rural localities in Urus-Martanovsky District